Dorleta Eskamendi Gil (born 2 January 1992) is a Spanish professional racing cyclist. She rides for team Bizkaia–Durango.

See also
 List of 2015 UCI Women's Teams and riders

References

External links

1992 births
Living people
Spanish female cyclists
Place of birth missing (living people)
Cyclists from the Basque Country (autonomous community)
People from Errenteria
Sportspeople from Gipuzkoa